The Manheim Prize is the oldest amateur soccer trophy in the United States. Its inscription reads, "The Manheim Prize for Association Football offered 1902 by the Germantown Cricket Club for annual competition among the Association of Cricket Clubs of Philadelphia and such other clubs as they may invite."

Allegro Soccer Club won its seventh consecutive Cricket League title on 23 November 2014 over Merion , 4-0.

Prize winners
1902-03 Merion Cricket Club
1903-04
1904-05 Haverford College
1905-06 Philadelphia and Reading A.A.
1906-07 Philadelphia and Reading A.A.
1907-08 Merion Cricket Club
1908-09 Merion Cricket Club
1909-10 Belmont Cricket Club
1910-11 Belmont Cricket Club
1911-12 Belmont Cricket Club
1912-13 Belmont Cricket Club
1913-14 Merchantville Field Club
1914-15 Merchantville Field Club
1915-16 Moorestown Field Club
1916-17 Merion Cricket Club Whites
1917-18 Haverford College
1918-19 World War- No Competition
1919-20 Merion Cricket Club
1920-21 Germantown Cricket Club
1921-22 Philadelphia Cricket Club
1922-23 Merion Cricket Club
1923-24 Philadelphia Cricket Club
1924-25 Germantown Cricket Club
1925-26 Germantown Cricket Club
1926-27 Moorestown Field Club
1927-28 Moorestown Field Club
1928-29 Philadelphia Cricket Club
1929-30 Philadelphia Cricket Club
1930-31 Philadelphia Cricket Club
1931-32 Philadelphia Cricket Club
1932-33 Philadelphia Cricket Club
1933-34 Haverford Soccer Club
1934-35 Philadelphia Cricket Club
1935-36 Moorestown Field Club
1936-37 Philadelphia Cricket Club
1937-38 Haverford Club
1938-39 No Award- 3 Way Tie
1939-40 Haverford Club
1940-41 Haverford Club
1941-42 Haverford Club
1942-43 World War II
1946-47 Germantown Cricket Club
1947-48 Germantown Cricket Club
1948-49 Haverford Club
1949-50 Haverford Club
1950-51 Haverford Club
1951-52 Germantown Cricket Club
1952-53 Germantown Cricket Club
1953-54 Germantown Cricket Club
1954-55 Germantown Cricket Club
1955-56 Germantown Cricket Club
1956-57 Germantown Cricket Club
1957-58 Germantown Cricket Club
1958-59 Germantown Cricket Club
1959-60 Germantown Cricket Club
1960-61 Germantown Cricket Club
1961-62 Germantown Cricket Club
1962-63 Merion Cricket Club
1963-64 Germantown Cricket Club
1964-65 Merion Cricket Club
1965-66 Germantown Cricket Club
1966-67 Germantown Cricket Club
1967-68 Penn Players Club
1968-69 Moorestown Field Club
1969-70 Moorestown Field Club
1970-71 St. Joseph Alumni
1971-72 Moorestown Field Club
1972-73 Three Way Tie
1973-74 Penn Players Club
1974-75 Penn Players Club
1975-76 Philadelphia Cricket Club
1976-77 Philadelphia Cricket Club
1977-78 Merion Cricket Club
1978-79 Haverford College Alumni
1979-80 Merion Cricket Club
1980-81 Penn Players Club
1981-82 Merion Cricket Club
1982-83 Haverford College Alumni
1983-84 Moorestown Field Club
1984 Haverford College AlumniMoorestown Field Club
1985 Episcopal Alumni
1986 Moorestown Field Club
1987 Episcopal Alumni
1988 Episcopal AlumniGermantown Academy
1989 Episcopal Alumni
1990 Merion Cricket Club
1991 Episcopal Alumni
1992 Merion Cricket Club
1993 Germantown Academy
1994 Merion Cricket Club
1995 Merion Cricket Club
1996 Philadelphia Cricket Club
1997 Episcopal Alumni
1998 Merion Cricket Club
1999 Merion Cricket Club
2000 Merion Cricket Club
2001 Merion Cricket Club
2002 Merion Cricket Club
2003 Moorestown Field Club
2004 Merion Cricket Club
2005 Allegro Soccer Club
2006 Merion Cricket Club
2007 Moorestown Field Club
2008 Allegro Soccer Club
2009 Allegro Soccer Club
2010 Allegro Soccer Club
2011 Allegro Soccer Club
2012 Allegro Soccer Club
2013 Allegro Soccer Club
2014 Allegro Soccer Club

References 

Haverford Fords soccer
Soccer competitions in the United States
1902 establishments in the United States